3-MeO-PCMo is a dissociative anesthetic drug which is similar in structure to phencyclidine and been sold online as a designer drug. The inhibitory effect of 3-MeO-PCMo on the reduction in the density of the drebrin clusters by NMDAR stimulation with glutamic acid is lower than that of PCP or 3-MeO-PCP, with half maximal inhibitory concentration (IC50) values of 26.67 μM (3-MeO-PCMo), 2.02 μM (PCP) and 1.51 μM (3-MeO-PCP).

See also 
 Arylcyclohexylamine
 Ketamine
 3-HO-PCP
 3-MeO-PCE
 3-MeO-PCP
 4-MeO-PCP
 Methoxyketamine

References 

Arylcyclohexylamines
Dissociative drugs
4-Morpholinyl compunds
O-methylated phenols
Designer drugs